This is a list of defunct airlines of India.

See also
 List of airlines of India

References

India